Medherant Ltd is a British pharmaceutical company, based in Coventry. The company develops over-the-counter (OTC) and prescription transdermal patches for drug delivery.

History
Medherant Ltd was founded as a university spin-off by Professor David Haddleton and the University of Warwick in 2015 for the purpose of commercialisation of a novel drug delivery system.
Started as a research project in Haddleton Group at the University of Warwick in 2013, the company operates at the University of Warwick Science Park since March 2015 after securing an investment from the Mercia Fund Management in 2014.

Research
Using its research in bioadhesives and polymer chemistry, the company intends to introduce patches in 2019 which are able to deliver drugs via the transepidermal route. Medherant's TEPI patch technology aims to provide controlled delivery of the correct dose, and better patient experience. The technology is also designed to be environmentally and economically efficient, requiring no solvents for the fabrication process.

Medherant is also developing transdermal analgesic patches for pain relief, based on nonsteroidal anti-inflammatory drugs (NSAIDs), e.g. ibuprofen, lidocaine, diclofenac and methyl salicylate, with plans to release its first product on the market by 2019.

References

External links
 Haddleton Group

Companies based in Coventry
Pharmaceutical companies of the United Kingdom